Maaya Thotta (மாய தோட்டா) is a 2023 Indian Tamil-language Action crime thriller streaming television series, directed by Nandhakumar Raju, produced as an Original for Hungama under the banner of Roox Media Pvt Ltd.

The principal characters of the series include Amit Bhargav, Chaitra Reddy and Kumaran Thangarajan. The six episodes series premiered on Hungama on 28 February 2023.

Synopsis
The story revolves around the of a Minister under mysterious circumstances amidst the presence of high security. The police investigation to unveil the truth behind the sinister murder, turns into a race against time.

Cast
 Amit Bhargav as Ranjan
 Chaitra Reddy
 Kumaran Thangarajan as Bharath, Z level protection.
 Vaishali Thaniga as Akalya Ranjan

Development

Production
The series is produced by Madhu Alexander and Prabhu Antony under the production Roox Media Private limited. It was first Tamil Original series for Hungama.

References

External links 
 

Tamil-language web series
2023 Tamil-language television series debuts
Hungama TV original programming
Tamil-language thriller television series
Tamil-language action television series
Tamil-language crime television series
Tamil-language political television series